Birdman or (The Unexpected Virtue of Ignorance) is a 2014 American black comedy-drama film co-written, co-produced, and directed by Alejandro G. Iñárritu, released on October 17, 2014 in the United States. In addition to its competitive awards, the American Film Institute selected it as one of the Top 11 Films of 2014.

Accolades

Notes

See also
 2014 in film

References

External links
 

Lists of accolades by film